Gravitcornutia rhomboidea is a species of moth of the family Tortricidae. It is found in São Paulo, Brazil. It was first identified there in 1987.

The wingspan is 13 mm. The ground colour of the forewings is white sprinkled and suffused with brownish. The markings are black brown. The hindwings are cream, but brownish on the periphery.  This species is visually very similar to Gravitcornutia nigribasana.

Etymology
This specie's name refers to the shape of the sterigma lobes and is derived from Latin rhombus (meaning rhomb).

References

Moths described in 2010
Gravitcornutia
Moths of South America
Taxa named by Józef Razowski